Richard Judge is a British singer, producer and DJ from Bishop's Stortford, England. Previously performing under the alias J.U.D.G.E, his vocals feature on tracks with artists such as Robin Schulz, Tube & Berger, Kungs, Spada, and DJ Vinne.

Biography
Judge spent most of his life in London DJing at all night raves and house parties before he met German electronic producer and DJ Santé, and the two collaborated on the song "AWAKE". The song went on to become an underground hit following its signing to Ultra Records and a high-profile remix from Agoria.

Judge's collaboration with Tube & Berger, "Disarray" spent six weeks in the Deep House Top 10 and led Magnetic Magazine to describe him as "Dance music's next star vocalist".

His 2015 collaboration with Robin Schulz on the track "Show Me Love" received notable exposure and critical acclaim from Resident Advisor as well as receiving over 95 million views on YouTube. The single "Show Me Love" had chart success in Europe, reaching No. 1 in Germany and Poland, No. 2 in Austria and No. 4 in Switzerland. In 2016, Judge released "Stain My Soul"  on Subjekt Recordings in May 2016.

Judge has since been a DJ at festivals like Street Parade in Zurich and FFH Radio Festival in Frankfurt, and at Pacha and clubs all over Europe. He was a live act at the Swiss Music Awards, the Czech Blog awards and toured Arenas all over Europe with Robin Schulz, had a residency at Heart Club Munich, Pacha Poznan, and played his first SE Asia tour in 2018.

In 2019, Judge teamed up with Brazilian producer DJ Vinne for "Won't Let You Down", a cover of the 1980s UK pop group Ph.D.'s "I Won't Let You Down."

Judge has also collaborated with artists such as Televisor and Eagles and Butterflies.

Discography

References 

British pop singers
British record producers
English DJs
Living people
1987 births
British dance musicians